Annabelle "Anna" Frances Glasier OBE, FFSRH, FRCOG FRSE is an English physician in the field of reproductive medicine. Glasier is a world expert on emergency contraception, and her work has been instrumental in making it available in the UK and other countries without medical prescription

Education
In 1973, Glasier graduated from the University of Bristol with a BSc. She then attended the University of Edinburgh graduating with a MBChB in 1976. She specialised in obstetrics and gynaecology, working under the supervision of Allan Templeton. She passed her MD in 1983, qualifying as a doctor. Her thesis was on the hormonal mechanisms underlying lactational infertility.

Career 
In 1989, Glasier became a clinical scientist at the Medical Research Council Unit of Reproductive Biology. She held the position of Director of Family Planning and Well Woman Services at NHS Lothian from 1990-2010, and was Lead Clinician for Sexual Health. Her research specialities are reproductive health, and she is globally recognised in the field of emergency contraception, with her work playing an instrumental role in its deregulation.

She has worked with international organisations, including the Population Council in New York, and the World Health Organization, where she chaired the Human Reproduction Programme’s Scientific and Technical Advisory Group from 2004 to 2008.

She is an honorary professor at the London School of Hygiene and Tropical Medicine (Department of Public Health and Policy) and the Emeritus Professor in the Centre for Reproductive Health at the University of Edinburgh.

Awards and honours 
 OBE for services to women's health, 2005
 Honorary Doctor of Laws from the University of Dundee, 2006
 Lifetime achievement award, Society of Family Planning, 2012
 Honorary graduate of the University of Aberdeen, 2014
 Fellow of the Royal Society of Edinburgh, 2015
 Fellow of the Royal College of Obstetricians and Gynaecologists

Personal life
Glasier is the daughter of Phillip Glasier and sister of Jemima Parry-Jones, both noted for their work with birds of prey.

References

External links 

 

Living people
20th-century English medical doctors
English obstetricians
British gynaecologists
British medical researchers
Officers of the Order of the British Empire
Alumni of the University of Edinburgh
Fellows of the Royal Society of Edinburgh
Alumni of the University of Bristol
Family planning
Fellows of the Royal College of Obstetricians and Gynaecologists
Year of birth missing (living people)